Máiréad Ní Ghráda (23 December 1896 – 13 June 1971) was an Irish poet, playwright, and broadcaster born in Kilmaley, County Clare.

Biography
Ní Ghráda's mother was Bridget Ní Ghrianna while her father, Tony Kelly, was a farmer, local county councillor and liked to hurl in his spare time. It is thought it was from him Máiréad got her love for the Irish language and he was known to recite ancient Munster Irish poems such as Cúirt an Mheán Oíche.

Ní Ghráda was jailed during the Irish War of Independence in 1921 for selling republican flags, and later she became the secretary to the Cumann na nGaedheal TD Ernest Blythe.

Ní Ghráda was a children's program compiler on the 1926 radio station 2RN (which went on to become Radio Éireann), later becoming the station's principal announcer in 1929, holding that position until 1935 when she became a part-time announcer.

During this period Ní Ghráda began to write radio and stage productions, and her play Micheál won an Abbey Theatre award in 1933.

Notable works

Ní Ghráda's  was first performed in Micheál Mac Liammóir's Gate Theatre in Dublin in 1935. It was performed many times in subsequent decades.

Ní Ghráda is widely known for her 1964 play  which brought her into the public eye, showing the harshness of Irish society and the hypocrisy at the time.

Ní Ghráda's play  is well known, and currently serves as an option of study for A-Level Irish in Northern Ireland.

Progress in Irish
Ní Ghráda is the author of one of the most widely used grammar books on the Irish Language, Progress in Irish.

is a 1937 comedy produced at the Peacock Theatre in Dublin focusing on a complex marital situation. Two years beforehand Ní Ghráda was forced to give up her job in RTÉ when her husband, a senior Garda, was reinstated to his post.

Ní Ghráda's 1938 translation of Peter Pan, the first in Irish.

(1940) is regarded as the first science fiction book in Irish.

References

Further reading
 Influence of Bertolt Brecht on Máiréad Ní Ghráda

1896 births
1971 deaths
Irish women poets
People from County Clare
Irish women dramatists and playwrights
20th-century Irish women writers
20th-century Irish poets
20th-century Irish dramatists and playwrights
Irish-language writers